Rakheswar Brahma is a Bodoland People's Front politician from Assam. He was elected in Assam Legislative Assembly election in 2011 from Majbat constituency.

References 

Living people
Bodoland People's Front politicians
People from Udalguri district
Assam MLAs 2011–2016
Year of birth missing (living people)